Michael Small (May 30, 1939 – November 24, 2003) was an American film score composer known for his scores to the movies Klute, The Parallax View, Marathon Man, and The Star Chamber.

Personal life

Small was born in New York City but grew up in Maplewood, New Jersey. His father, Jack Small, was an actor and later, the general manager of the Shubert Theater in New York City. Small did his undergraduate work at Williams College where he was graduated with a degree in English. He later studied for a year at Harvard University.

Small died from prostate cancer on November 24, 2003; he was 64 years old.

Filmography

References

External links
 
 
 
 
 "Michael Small Explores the Mountains of the Moon, interview by Matthias Büdinger; originally published in Soundtrack Magazine (volume 9, number 35, 1990), posted at Soundtrack: The CinemaScore and Soundtrack Archives
 Music cue sheet for "The Doorbell Rang" (2001), the premiere episode of the A&E TV series A Nero Wolfe Mystery, at The Wolfe Pack, official site of the Nero Wolfe Society
 Obituary in Film Score Monthly, December 5, 2003
 Obituary in the Los Angeles Times, December 5, 2003
 Obituary at Broadcast Music Inc., December 10, 2003
Obituary in The New York Times, December 15, 2003
 Obituary in The Independent, January 3, 2004

American film score composers
American male film score composers
1939 births
2003 deaths
Deaths from prostate cancer
Deaths from cancer in New York (state)
20th-century American composers
20th-century American male musicians